Brou Benjamin Angoua (born 28 November 1986) is an Ivorian professional footballer who plays as a centre-back for French Championnat National club Stade Briochin. He is equally adept at playing as either a defensive midfielder or a central defender. He has represented the Ivory Coast national football team at the Olympic Games and the Africa Cup of Nations.

Club career
Born in Anyama, Angoua began his career with local club Toumodi. He also played for Africa Sports National in the Côte d'Ivoire Premier Division.

After two seasons with the club, Angoua moved abroad to play with Budapest Honvéd in Hungary. He spent four years at the club, in which he made over 90 appearances.

In 2010, Angoua moved to France to play with first division club Valenciennes. After a four-season-and-a half at Valenciennes, he signed on to play for Guingamp on 15 July 2014. After two and a half years in Brittany, he signed with New England Revolution on a one-year loan. His loan was not extended following the 2017 season.

On 30 December 2018, he signed a one-and-a-half year contract with Super League Greece club Levadiakos for an undisclosed fee.

Angoua left Greece at the end of his Levadiakos contract, returning to France to sign a one-year deal with newly promoted Championnat National side Stade Briochin in July 2020.

International career
Angoua represented the Ivory Coast under-23 team at the 2008 Olympic Games, losing in the quarterfinals to Nigeria.

On 18 November 2009, Angoua made his senior team debut in a 2–2 friendly draw against Germany, coming on as a substitute for Cheick Tioté. He scored his first goal in a 2–0 friendly against Rwanda, scoring in the 90th minute.

Angoua was named to the squad for the 2010 Africa Cup of Nations and 2010 FIFA World Cup, but didn't make an appearance in either tournament. He made an appearance for the senior team at the 2012 Africa Cup of Nations, coming on as a substitute for Igor Lolo in a 2–0 win against Angola.

Honors
Ivory Coast
Africa Cup of Nations runner-up:2012

References

External links

Kicker Profile

1986 births
Living people
Footballers from Abidjan
Association football defenders
Association football midfielders
Ivorian footballers
Africa Sports d'Abidjan players
Budapest Honvéd FC players
Valenciennes FC players
En Avant Guingamp players
New England Revolution players
Toumodi FC players
Levadiakos F.C. players
Stade Briochin players
Ligue 1 players
Championnat National players
Championnat National 2 players
Championnat National 3 players
Major League Soccer players
Nemzeti Bajnokság I players
Footballers at the 2008 Summer Olympics
Olympic footballers of Ivory Coast
Ivorian expatriate sportspeople in Hungary
2010 Africa Cup of Nations players
2010 FIFA World Cup players
Ivorian expatriate footballers
Expatriate footballers in France
Expatriate footballers in Hungary
2012 Africa Cup of Nations players
Ivory Coast international footballers